Badminton at the 2013 Islamic Solidarity Games was held in GOR Dempo Jaka Baring, Palembang, Indonesia from 23 September to 30 September 2013.

Medalists

Medal table

References

Results
Team Events Results

External links
Official website
2013 South Sumatera

2013 Islamic Solidarity Games
Islamic Solidarity Games
2013 Islamic Solidarity Games
2013